Wielgie  is a village in Lipno County, Kuyavian-Pomeranian Voivodeship, in central Poland. It is the seat of the gmina (administrative district) called Gmina Wielgie.

History
During the German occupation of Poland (World War II), Poles from Wielgie were among the victims of large massacres of Poles from the county carried out by the Germans in nearby Karnkowo as part of the Intelligenzaktion.

References

Wielgie
Płock Governorate
Warsaw Voivodeship (1919–1939)
Pomeranian Voivodeship (1919–1939)